Haliplus sibiricus is a species of water beetle from Haliplidae family that can be found in Finland, Norway, Sweden, Latvia, and northern Russia.

References

Beetles described in 1860
Beetles of Europe
Haliplidae